A persona is a social role or a character played by an actor.

Persona or personas may also refer to:

 Persona (psychology), a Jungian complex
 Persona (satellite), a class of Russian reconnaissance satellite
 Persona (user experience), in marketing, a character representing a particular user type within a targeted demographic

Arts and entertainment

 Persona (series), a Japanese role-playing video game franchise developed by Atlus
 Persona, an award-winning collection of photographs by Japanese photographer Hiroh Kikai

Film and television
 Persona (1966 film), directed by Ingmar Bergman
 Persona (2008 film), written and directed by Tatsuro Kashihara
 Persona (2012 film), written and directed by George Arif
 Persona (Turkish miniseries)
 Persona (South Korean anthology series)
 "Persona", an episode of Law & Order: Special Victims Unit tenth season

Music

 Persona (Karnivool EP), 2001
 Persona (Kangta album), 2005
 Persona (Lorenzo Senni EP), 2016
 Persona (Queen Latifah album), 2009
 Persona (Mari Hamada album), 1996
 Persona (Marracash album), 2019
 Persona (Rival Consoles album), 2018
 Persona (Selah Sue album), 2022
 "Persona" (song), song by South Korean rapper RM of BTS
 Person(a), a 1987 album by Norman Iceberg
 PersonA, a 2016 album by Edward Sharpe and the Magnetic Zeros
 Personae (album), a 2002 live album by Jonas Hellborg
 Personas (album), a 2008 album by El Canto del Loco
 Map of the Soul: Persona, 2019 EP by South Korean boy group BTS

Business and brands

 Persona Communications, a former Canadian cable television operator now part of Eastlink
 PersonaTV, a former television production subsidiary of the above
 Mazda Persona, a midsize sedan manufactured by Japanese automaker Mazda from 1988–1992
 Mozilla Persona, a defunct website authentication mechanism prototyped by Mozilla from 2011–2016
 Proton Persona, a series of compact/subcompact sedans manufactured by Proton since 2003

See also
 Person (disambiguation)
 Latin phrases:
 Actio personalis moritur cum persona, "personal action dies with the person"
 Ad personam, "to the person"
 Dramatis personæ, "the masks of the drama"
 In persona Christi, "in the person of Christ"
 Persona designata, "A person considered as an individual rather than as a member of a class"
 Persona non grata (disambiguation), "unwelcome person"
 Third persona, an alienated audience implicitly ignored within a dialectic